"Classic" is the 35th single by the Japanese rock band Mucc, released on September 19, 2016 in three editions by Sony Japan. It is the opening theme of the anime series The Seven Deadly Sins: Signs of Holy War.  The title track was composed by Yukke and the single was produced by Ken, guitarist of L'Arc-en-Ciel.

Composition 
"Classic" was composed by bassist Yukke, who admitted being a fan of the series Nanatsu no Taizai: "When it was decided [that the song would be the opening theme] I was very happy". He claims that it took about a month to compose the song, while receiving tips from the other members. The demo version of the song was more similar to an anime song than the current one, Yukke asked producer Ken to transform it into a song more similar to Mucc, although the initial melody has not been changed.

The lyrics were written by Yukke too and co-written by vocalist Tatsurō, who emphasized that much of it was actually done by the bassist. According to Yukke, the lyrics were based on "the ability to protect the weakest, as presented in the anime". Tatsurō also said that while singing an original version of the lyrics, he felt that "something was not right" and asked the bassist to rewrite it. Yukke chose the title "Classic" "with the hope of being a song that will remain forever even if it disappears, as an important thing that everyone has."

Release 
On June 28, simultaneously with the release of Heide's music video on YouTube, the release of "Classic" was announced and that would be the opening theme for The Seven Deadly Sins: Signs of Holy War anime series.

The song was first introduced on August 3 on Tokyo FM's Jack in the Radio, where the singer Tatsurō performed as a presenter.

On August 28 Mucc released a TV edit version, with 1:30 in length, on streaming platforms like iTunes. On September 14, three teasers of the music video were released on the official Mucc YouTube channel, with a background voice narrated by the voice actor of the protagonist Meliodas, Yuki Kaji.

As usual for the band, a regular edition containing only the CD and a limited edition accompanying the bonus DVD were released. However, this time a third edition was released: the anime edition, containing a poster of Nanatsu no Taizai. This edition was limited to purchase until the end of December 2016.

Commercial performance
"Classic" peaked at the 15th place on Oricon Singles Chart and remained for four weeks.

Track listing

Limited edition 
 DVD

Personnel 
 Tatsurou- vocal
 Miya - guitar
 Yukke - bass
 Satochi - drums
 Ken - producer

Charts

Covers
In 2017 the Japanese band Flow covered the song for the tribute album Tribute of Mucc -en-.

References 

Anime songs
Japanese rock songs
Japanese-language songs
2016 songs
2016 singles